Trout Lake is an unincorporated community in northern Alberta within the Municipal District of Opportunity No. 17, located  east of Highway 88,  northeast of Grande Prairie.

Demographics 

See also 
List of communities in Alberta
List of designated places in Alberta

References 

Designated places in Alberta
Localities in the Municipal District of Opportunity No. 17